The 1961 Thomas Cup competition is an international team tournament for supremacy in men's badminton (Its female counterpart is the Uber Cup). Beginning in 1948–49 it was held every three years until 1982 and thereafter every two years. Nineteen teams, eighteen of them starting from four regional qualifying zones, Asia, Australasia, Europe, and Pan America, contested for the Thomas Cup during the 1960-1961 seasons. Zone winners then played-off in Jakarta, Indonesia for the right to face defending champion Indonesia (exempt from all earlier ties), in a conclusive challenge round. For a more detailed description of the Thomas Cup format, see Wikipedia's general article on the Thomas Cup.

This was the first ever international multi-sport event hosted by Indonesia, who was only 15 years old at the time. The venue was the Istora Gelora Bung Karno, which was only opened on 11 days before the tournament.

Intra-zone summary
Despite missing its best known singles player, Charoen Wattanasin, Thailand again prevailed in the Asian zone by beating, consecutively, India (6–3), three time former champion Malaya (7–2), and Pakistan (8–1). Of note in these ties, the talented Nandu Natekar had a hand in all of the individual matches which India salvaged, while Malaya's Eddie Choong, well past his prime at a fairly young age, was routinely beaten in both of his singles. No player on Thailand's team was more than twenty-four years old.

For the second straight time Japan defaulted an Australasian zone tie, this time allowing Australia, led by Kenneth Turner, to advance to the inter-zone phase after its 8–1 victory over New Zealand. Star-studded Denmark coasted through three ties in the European zone, shutting out its usual victim England in the zone final. The same two-way American zone race ended as before with the United States beating Canada 7–2. Evergreen Joe Alston and Wynn Rogers still led the way in doubles for the USA which also had a small but competent cadre of international level singles players.

Inter-zone playoffs
Australasia
 Australia
 Indonesia (exempt until challenge round)

Asia
 Thailand

Europe
 Denmark

America
 United States

The inter-zone playoffs in Jakarta began on the first two days of June with Thailand beating Australia without the loss of a match or a game. Denmark then defeated the USA 7–2, but even in victory Danish problems with the heat and humidity were evident as players hailed by some as the best in the world often struggled against less talented opponents who, as Californians, were more accustomed to hot gymnasiums. 

The Danes' contest against Thailand fully demonstrated this weakness. A team entirely composed of either past, present, or future All-England champions was decisively beaten by a team composed of players who would never win that individual honor. Erland Kops and Finn Kobbero defeated the Thai number two Somsook Boonyasukhanonda comfortably, but both were beaten by young Channarong Ratanaseangsuang. Most shockingly, the famous doubles team of Kobbero and Hammergaard Hansen was beaten by both Thai pairs who swept all four doubles matches. Thus Thailand completed its run to the challenge round with an impressive 7–2 victory over Denmark.

First round

Final round

Challenge round
The task of beating a strong Indonesian team in Jakarta's Senayan Stadiam was possibly rendered even more difficult for Thailand when "neutral" officials and linesmen failed to arrive from Malaya. As they had done three years earlier in Singapore, the Indonesians swept all five singles matches. Ratanaseangsuang was unable to produce the consistency he had displayed against Kops and Kobbero and lost tamely to Indonesia's Tan Joe Hok and Ferry Sonneville. Boonyasukhanonda was simply not in the class of the two Indonesians, whose careers would be hallmarked by their Thomas Cup brilliance. The Thai doubles pairs played quite well, particularly the team of Narong Bhornchima and Raphi Kanchanaraphi who won both of their matches. Doubles victories were not enough, however, as Indonesia retained the Cup 6–3.

References
 tangkis.tripod.com
 Mike's Badminton Populorum 
Herbert Scheele, The International Badminton Federation Handbook for 1967 (Canterbury, Kent, England: J. A. Jennings Ltd., 1967) 82.
Pat Davis, The Guinness Book of Badminton (Enfield, Middlesex, England: Guinness Superlative Ltd., 1983). 122.

Thomas Cup
Thomas & Uber Cup
T
Badminton tournaments in Indonesia